Learning from the Germans: Race and the Memory of Evil is a 2019 non-fiction book by Susan Neiman, published by Farrar, Straus and Giroux in the United States and by Allen Lane in the United Kingdom. The author argues that German society has largely accepted responsibility for and learned from actions done by the country in the past, particularly in World War II, while the United States had not done the same, particularly for Jim Crow violations.

Neiman stated that each country has its particular history but that studying the incidents in Germany shows that society can atone for past crimes and improve even though doing so is a difficult process. Neiman in particular believes that many Americans lack an understanding of the United States Civil War as well as the Jim Crow period, contributing to issues in American society present in 2019. She believes the United States would benefit from its own corresponding Vergangenheitsbewältigung.

Background
Neiman, a Jewish woman, who was born in the Southern United States, had lived there for a portion of her youth. Neiman's mother, who originated from Chicago, had worked to ensure racial integration at Atlanta Public Schools during the Civil Rights Movement of the mid-20th century. Neiman resided in Berlin, Germany beginning in 1989 to study the philosophy of Immanuel Kant and resided there for a period of at least 22 years. She became a moral philosopher, and in Berlin she became the head of the Einstein Forum.

The idea came to the book when she noticed American society still celebrating the Confederate States of America even though President of the United States Barack Obama had publicly condemned racism while honoring the victims of the Charleston Church Shooting, which had just happened. She spent at least three years conducting research for the book; that involved reading works about the post-Nazi Germany period, which describe how Germans initially did not feel guilt about the events. In addition to interviewing people in Germany, as part of this task she traveled to the United States and conducted interviews there too; she visited Mississippi in that process. The author said that she incorporated about 50% of the interviews in the book.

The process of the book began prior to the 2016 United States Presidential Election and the Brexit referendum, and she stated that prior to the former she believed the United States was about to absorb messages from historical incidents. The author completed the book despite concerns that the message may not be absorbed in light of the outcomes of those events.

Contents

The book discusses how society in both East Germany and West Germany initially resisted taking responsibility for World War II incidents, but that this understanding developed decades after the war. This solidified after the reunification of Germany as the two halves could no longer assign blame to the other for atrocities. According to Neiman, East German society had more thoroughly opposed Nazism than West Germany partly because the latter opposed Soviet-aligned states with people who formerly worked for Nazi Germany. The book also discusses the Charleston Church Shooting.

Reception
Deborah E. Lipstadt wrote in The New York Times that the work "is an important and welcome weapon in" cultural battles about historical events, and that while "Optimally, a reviewer’s evaluation should not be influenced by where she read a book", her understanding was enhanced by what she calls attempts from the government of Poland to minimize Polish culpability in the Holocaust.

Alex Clark of The Guardian wrote that the author "is fascinating and potent on how the Holocaust has functioned on multiple planes, and primarily as an example of pure evil that, by consequence, allows other societies to divert attention from their own misdeeds."

Kirkus Reviews stated that the work is "A timely, urgent call to revisit the past with an eye to correction and remedy." The publication added that "While direct equations between, say, the American secessionists and the Nazis are problematic, there are plenty of points in common."

Neiman's treatment of Communism and the East German regime in Learning from the Germans: Race and the Memory of Evil has attracted the attention of more skeptical reviewers. Neiman writes that "anti-fascist" sentiments were genuine in the GDR and that "East Germany did a better job of working off the Nazi past than West Germany." McElvoy writes that "where the account goes awfully wrong is in the musings on East Germany, where Neiman is prone to accepting the GDR’s self-serving use of its “anti-fascist” badging at a face value it never merited, despite the good faith of many cultural figures in the idea." McElvoy continues, "The account of the east today is a medley of interviews with a lot of people from the 1989 opposition movements. It would be a bit like talking about Brexit Britain through the eyes of a lot of Remainers and Lib Dems. The narrative of “colonisation” of the east by the west after unification is treated unsceptically." 

Some reviewers took issue with Neiman's omission of Soviet crimes. Specifically, she does not address the fact that Soviet soldiers raped two million German women and girls towards the end of the war. Reviewer Heather Souvaine Horn writes that "in the section praising the Treptow monument to fallen Soviet soldiers, she fails to discuss the mass rape suffered by German women at the hands of the Red Army. Knowing that the Red Army raped untold numbers of German women, does the monument to fallen Soviet soldiers in East Berlin really represent a society coming to terms with history? Or does it represent a particularly grisly form of forgetting?" Historian Thomas Laqueur makes similar comments in his review, writing that "it’s worth considering the amnesia that monuments like the one in Treptower Park induce. Red Army soldiers raped around two million German women towards the end of the war. Few of the women who attended the celebration of Germany’s surrender on 8 May 1950 would have escaped this fate, but they had no voice. Theirs was a past that would not be spoken of in public for half a century."

References

Further reading

External links
 Learning from the Germans: Race and the Memory of Evil - Macmillan Publishers
 Learning from the Germans: Race and the Memory of Evil - Penguin Books UK
 Susan Neiman Official Website
 Videos
 
 
 

2019 non-fiction books
Books about Germany
Books about the United States
Social philosophy literature
Farrar, Straus and Giroux books
American non-fiction books
Reparations for slavery
Allen Lane (imprint) books